USC&GS Pioneer was a survey ship that served in the United States Coast and Geodetic Survey from 1922 to 1941. She was the first ship of the Coast and Geodetic Survey to bear the name.

Construction and United States Navy service

Pioneer was laid down as the United States Navy minesweeper USS Osprey (Minesweeper No. 29) by Gas Engine and Power Company at Morris Heights, New York, on 14 November 1917. She was launched on either 14 November 1918  or 19 November 1918 and was commissioned on 7 January 1919.

Osprey assisted in sweeping the North Sea Mine Barrage in 1919. She spent 1920 in ordinary at Portsmouth, New Hampshire, and was redesignated AM-29 that year. She was decommissioned at Portsmouth on 12 December 1920.

United States Coast and Geodetic Survey career

In 1922 Osprey steamed to Boston, Massachusetts, where she was transferred to the U.S. Department of Commerce on 7 April 1922. She entered service in the U.S. Coast and Geodetic Survey that year as the survey ship Pioneer. Pioneer and survey ships USC&GS Discoverer—formerly the U.S. Navy minesweeper USS Auk (AM-38)—and USC&GS Guide—formerly the U.S. Navy minesweeper USS Flamingo (AM-32)—were collectively known in the Coast and Geodetic Survey as the "Bird Boats" because of their former Navy names. Pioneer spent her Coast and Geodetic Survey career on duties on the United States West Coast and in the Territory of Alaska.

Tragedy struck Pioneer on 11 October 1928 when a member of her crew -- Seaman Earl Forsberg—fell overboard and drowned during a survey of Heceta Bank off the coast of Oregon.

In 1934 personnel aboard Pioneer developed a deep sea hydrophone in connection with the Survey's work developing radio acoustic ranging, a system in which a small TNT bomb timed to explode at about  feet, the explosion's sound wave is registered by a hydrophone aboard and hydrophones at two or more known shore locations that then send a radio signal of arrival time back to the vessel for range calculation, to better establish positions beyond shore signal visibility.

During her career, Pioneer occasionally rendered assistance to mariners in distress and assisted civil authorities ashore. On 28 November 1934, she sighted a yacht flying a distress signal; closing to investigate, she found that the yacht had a disabled engine and took it in tow off Point Vicente, California. On 20 December 1935, she was pierside at Long Beach, California, California, when a fire broke out on the pier; her crew contained the fire until the local fire department arrived on the scene.

Return to U.S. Navy service

In 1941, Pioneer was transferred back to the U.S. Navy, which commissioned her as the salvage ship USS Crusader (ARS-2). Crusader operated from the Panama Canal Zone throughout World War II. She was decommissioned in 1947 and sold in 1952.

Commemoration

Two underwater geographic features of the Pacific Ocean, Pioneer Seamount and Pioneer Canyon, are named for Pioneer.

Notes

References

NavSource.org NavSource Online: Mine Warfare Vessel Photo Archive USS Crusader (ARS 2) ex-USC&GS Pioneer ex-USS Osprey (AM 29) ex-Minesweeper No. 29
NOAA History, A Science Odyssey: Tools of the Trade: Ships: Coast and Geodetic Survey Ships: Pioneer
NOAA History, A Science Odyssey: Hall of Honor: Lifesaving and Protection of Property by the Coast & Geodetic Survey 1845-1937
NOAA History, A Science Odyssey: Hall of Honor: In the Line of Duty 1846-1936

Ships of the United States Coast and Geodetic Survey
Survey ships of the United States
Ships built in Morris Heights, Bronx
1918 ships